Spargania aurata is a species of geometrid moth in the family Geometridae. It is found in Central America and North America.

The MONA or Hodges number for Spargania aurata is 7310.

References

Further reading

 
 

Hydriomenini
Articles created by Qbugbot
Moths described in 1882